Felt Mountain is the debut studio album by English electronic music duo Goldfrapp. It was released on 11 September 2000 by Mute Records. The album takes influence from a variety of music styles such as 1960s pop, cabaret, folk and electronica.

Felt Mountain was generally well received by music critics, and was described as "simultaneously smarmy and seductive, yet elegant and graceful". It peaked at number 57 on the UK Albums Chart, and was certified gold by the British Phonographic Industry (BPI) in October 2001. In 2001, the album was shortlisted for the Mercury Prize, an annual music prize awarded for the best British or Irish album from the previous year.

Recording and production
Goldfrapp signed a recording contract with London-based record label Mute Records in August 1999. The pair began recording their debut album over a six-month period, beginning in September 1999, in a rented bungalow in the Wiltshire countryside. The recording process was difficult for Alison Goldfrapp, who was often alone and disturbed by the mice and insects in the bungalow. Gregory described their recording sessions as intense because he was unaccustomed to composing with others. Goldfrapp contributed the album's lyrics, and Gregory and Goldfrapp composed the music together. The lyrics are abstract obsessional tales inspired by science fiction, films, Goldfrapp's childhood, and the loneliness she felt while recording the album. Musically, the album takes influence from a variety of styles including 1960s pop, cabaret, folk, and electronica.

Songs
"Lovely Head", Felt Mountain'''s opening track, features high lonesome whistling and heavily processed vocals. The song was described as influenced by Shirley Bassey and released as the album's lead single. The second track, "Paper Bag", is about being obsessed with someone and not being able to have them. It is followed by the third single "Human", a track with a mambo-style beat. The fourth song, "Pilots", which describes travellers floating in the atmosphere above the earth, was inspired by John Barry's James Bond theme songs. A remixed version of the song was released as a single in the United Kingdom, reaching number 68 on the UK Singles Chart.

The ballad "Deer Stop" features childlike vocals and sexually suggestive lyrics. The title track was influenced by Goldfrapp's "idea of a wolf being whipped in this little Tudor house overlooking a snowy landscape". "Oompa Radar", the seventh track, was inspired by Roman Polanski's 1966 film Cul-de-Sac. The cabaret-influenced song uses a flugelhorn and a cuckoo clock to switch between tempos. "Utopia" was released as the album's second single. The album closes with "Horse Tears", a minimalist piano ballad with filtered vocals.

Critical reception

The album received critical acclaim. AllMusic reviewer Heather Phares referred to the album as a "strange and beautiful mix of the romantic, eerie, and world-weary" and named it "one of 2000's most impressive debuts". Eric Wittmershaus of Flak Magazine called Felt Mountain "an enchanting, accessible debut", citing "Human" and "Deer Stop" as its best songs. In a review for Pitchfork, Matt LeMay described the album as "elegant and graceful", but felt that the "songs aren't all that different from one another." Sacha Esterson of musicOMH compared Felt Mountain to Portishead and wrote that it could be a "contender for the year's best album". Yahoo! Music's Ken Micallef commented that the duo "make elegiac music as elegant as 'Diamonds Are Forever' and as haunting as Bobbie Gentry's 'Ode to Billie Joe'", concluding that the album's "dark night of the soul is mostly bleak, beautiful, and deliciously bizarre." Andrew Lynch of entertainment.ie noted that "[a]lthough at times it  a little contrived, for the most part this is stylishly decadent music that should appeal to all fans of film noir." NME viewed the album as "cold, desolate and old-fashioned" and argued that Felt Mountain was not a "bad concept" except that "Portishead got there first, and managed to update the spy-film vibe with a hefty dose of break-driven twilight melancholia."Q magazine included the album on its list of the top 50 albums of 2000. The following year, Felt Mountain was shortlisted for the Mercury Prize, an annual music prize awarded for the best British or Irish album from the previous year. In 2006, the album was included in Robert Dimery's book 1001 Albums You Must Hear Before You Die. In November 2009, The Times ranked Felt Mountain at number 16 on its list of the 100 best pop albums of the 2000s. The album was placed at number 94 on Slant Magazines list of the best albums of the 2000s.

Commercial performanceFelt Mountain debuted at number 144 on the UK Albums Chart, selling 914 copies in its first week. In September 2001, the album peaked at number 57, and had sold 177,096 copies by August 2005. Felt Mountain was certified gold by the British Phonographic Industry (BPI) on 12 October 2001. In France, the album reached number 48, and remained on the albums chart for 11 weeks. It reached the top 40 in Germany and the top 50 in Australia and Austria. Despite not appearing on any major charts in North America, Felt Mountain had sold 52,000 copies in the United States as of August 2006. As of April 2003, the album had sold 500,000 copies worldwide.

Track listing
All lyrics written by Alison Goldfrapp; all music composed by Will Gregory and Goldfrapp, except where noted.

Personnel
Credits adapted from the liner notes of Felt Mountain''.

Goldfrapp
 Alison Goldfrapp – vocals, whistling, keyboards
 Will Gregory – keyboards, string arrangements, brass arrangements

Additional musicians

 Stuart Gordon – violin, viola ; tremolo violins ; violin solo 
 Adrian Utley – bass guitar ; synth, tremolo bass guitar 
 Nick Batt – bass synth ; metal percussion ; additional programming 
 John Parish – drums ; bass guitar, tremolo guitar 
 Alexander Bălănescu – violin 
 Sonia Slany – violin 
 Nick Barr – viola 
 Nick Cooper – cello 
 Mary Scully – double bass 
 Andy Davis – baritone ukulele, melodica, koto 
 Mute Male Voices – humming 
 Jacqueline Norrie – violin 
 Bill Hawkes – viola 
 Rowan Oliver – percussion 
 Andy Bush – trumpet ; flugelhorn solo 
 Ben Waghorn – tenor saxophone 
 John Cornick – trombone 
 Clive Deamer – brushes 
 Steve MacAllister – French horn 
 Steven Claydon – synth 
 Flowers Band – brass band 
 Tony Orrell – drums 
 Luke Gordon – additional programming 
 Chris Weston – additional programming

Technical

 Will Gregory – production
 Alison Goldfrapp – production
 Dave Bascombe – additional mixing 
 Nick Batt – additional mixing ; additional engineering 
 Kevin Paul – additional mixing ; additional engineering 
 Luke Gordon – additional engineering
 David Lord – additional engineering
 John Dent – mastering

Artwork

 Alison Goldfrapp – sleeve design
 Joe Dilworth – inside photo of Will Gregory, cover photo
 Anna Fox – inside photo of Alison Goldfrapp
 C. L. Schmidt – landscape photography
 Günter Gräfenhain – landscape photography

Charts

Certifications

Release history

Notes

References

2000 debut albums
Goldfrapp albums
Mute Records albums